The 2012 Finnish League Cup is the 16th season of the Finnish League Cup, Finland's second-most prestigious cup football tournament. FC Honka are the defending champions, having won their second league cup last year.

The cup consists of two stages. First there will be a group stage that involves the 12 Veikkausliiga teams divided into three groups. The top two teams and two best 3rd placed teams from each group will enter the one-legged elimination rounds – quarter-finals, semi-finals and the final.

Group stage
Every team will play every other team of its group twice, both home and away. The group stage matches will be played from 13 January to 17 March 2012.

Group 1

Group 2

Group 3

Third-placed qualifiers
At the end of the group stage, a comparison is made between the third placed teams. The two best third-placed teams will advance to the quarter-finals.

Knockout stage

Quarter-finals

Semi-finals

Final

References

Finnish League Cup
League Cup
Finnish League Cup